The Esperantist of the Year (Esperantisto de la Jaro) is an honorary designation bestowed each year by the editors of the Esperanto-language monthly La Ondo de Esperanto (English: The Wave of Esperanto). The award recipient is selected by an international jury led by Halina Gorecka, the Russian publisher of the magazine.

The Esperantist of the Year award was created in 1998.

Laureates
 1998: William Auld (1924–2006), a Scottish poet and translator who wrote chiefly in Esperanto
 1999: Kep Enderby (b. 1926 in Dubbo, Australia), former president of World Esperanto Association (UEA)
 2000: three candidates received an equal number of votes and shared the award:
 Hans Bakker (b. 1937 in the Netherlands)
 Maŭro La Torre (1946–2010), an Italian specialist in computational linguistics)
 Jouko Lindstedt (b. 1955), a Finnish professor of Slavonic studies
 2001: Osmo Buller (b. 1950 in Taivalkoski, Finland), president of World Esperanto Association (UEA)
 2002: Michel Duc-Goninaz (b. 1933 in Paris, now in Aix-en-Provence), for his editorship of a comprehensive Esperanto dictionary, the Nova Plena Ilustrita Vortaro de Esperanto (NPIV)
 2003: Dafydd ab Iago (b. 1968 in Abergavenny, Wales, now living in Brussels)
 2004: Helmar Frank (b. 1933 in Waiblingen, Germany)
 2005: Povilas Jegorovas (b. 1955 in Joniškis, Lithuania) for his activism in Lithuania on the occasion of that year's World Congress of Esperanto in Vilnius
 2006: Bertilo Wennergren (b. 1956 in Sweden) for his masterwork, the Plena Manlibro de Esperanta Gramatiko, an exhaustive treatment of Esperanto grammar
 2007: Peter Zilvar (b. 1950), a German living in Herzberg am Harz
 2008: Ilona Koutny (b. 1953 in Hungary) for her continuing competent and successful guidance of the Interlinguistic Studies department at the Adam Mickiewicz University in Poznań
 2009: Aleksander Korzhenkov (Александр Корженков, b. 1958), a Russian living in Kaliningrad
 2010: Katalin Kováts (b. 1957), a Hungarian living in the Netherlands
 2011: Dennis Keefe 
 2012: Peter Baláž (b. 1979), a Slovak living in Partizánske
 2013: Mark Fettes (b. 1961 in the United States), president of World Esperanto Association (UEA)
 2014: Mireille Grosjean
 2015: Chuck Smith, founder of Esperanto Wikipedia, creator of Esperanto course on Duolingo
 2016: Stefan MacGill, retired New Zealand educator and magazine editor, now living in Hungary
 2017: Huang Yinbao (b. 1962 in China)
 2018: Hori Jasuo (b. 1941 in Japan)
 2019: Anna Löwenstein (b. 1951), a writer living in the United Kingdom, well-known for her literary and educational contributions for decades. This honor is a special recognition of her work creating and contributing to the new website uea.facila.org.

In 2001 Osmo Buller and Claude Piron received an equal number of votes, but according to rules in effect that year, Buller was declared the winner, as more nominators had proposed his name.

See also

 List of language-related awards

External links

 Interviews with the laureates

Awards established in 1998
International awards
Language-related awards